Psychonotis is a genus of butterflies in the family Lycaenidae. The species of this genus are found in the Australasian realm.

Species
Psychonotis brownii (Druce & Bethune-Baker, 1893)
Psychonotis caelius (C. & R. Felder, 1860)
Psychonotis eleanor Tennent, 1999
Psychonotis eudocia (H. H. Druce and Bethune-Baker, 1893)
Psychonotis finisterre C.J. Müller, 2003
Psychonotis hebes (Druce, 1904)
Psychonotis hymetus (C. Felder, 1860)
Psychonotis julie Tennent, 1999
Psychonotis kruera (Druce, 1891)
Psychonotis marginalis C.J. Müller, 2003
Psychonotis melane (Joicey & Talbot, 1916)
Psychonotis parsonsi C.J. Müller, 2003
Psychonotis piepersii (Snellen, 1878)
Psychonotis purpurea (Druce, [1903])
Psychonotis slithyi Tennent, 1999
Psychonotis waihuru Tennent, 1999

References 
 , 1860 [1859]. Lepidopterologische Fragmenta. Parts 4 and 5. Wien ents. Monats. 4: 225-251, 2 pls., 394-402, 2 pls.
 , 1992. A generic classification of the tribe Polyommatini of the Oriental and Australian regions (Lepidoptera, Lycaenidae, Polyommatinae). Bulletin of the University of Osaka Prefecture, Ser B, Vol. 44, Suppl.
 , 2003: Three new species of Psychonotis Toxopeus (Lepidoptera: Lycaenidae) from Papua New Guinea. Australian Entomologist 30 (4): 159-165.
 , 1999: The genus Psychonotis Toxopeus in the Solomon Islands, with descriptions of five new taxa (Lepidoptera: Lycaenidae). Australian Entomologist 26 (4): 115-123.
 , 1930. De soorte als functie van Plaats en Tijd, 198 pp., 4 pls. Amsterdam.

External links

"Psychonotis Toxopeus, 1930" at Markku Savela's Lepidoptera and Some Other Life Forms

Polyommatini
Lycaenidae genera
Taxa named by Lambertus Johannes Toxopeus